Pete Hylton (born January 30, 1957) is the archivist and historian for the Sports Car Club of America. He is the author of two books: Ghost Tracks: A Historical Look at America’s Lost Road Racing Tracks and Sports Car Club of America 60 Years in Photos.

Engineering 

Hylton graduated summa cum laude in 1979 from Rose-Hulman Institute of Technology in Terre Haute, Indiana with a Bachelor of Science in Mechanical Engineering.  After graduation, he went to work as a test engineer for General Motors Alison Gas Turbines in Indianapolis.  In earned his M.S.M.E. on a General Motors Graduate Fellowship at Purdue University in West Lafayette, Indiana. After completing his graduate education, Pete continued his career with Alison (which was bought out by Rolls-Royce) until 2003.

Academic 

Hylton joined Indiana University Purdue University Indianapolis in 2003 as an Associate member of the faculty of the MET Department of the Purdue School of Engineering and Technology at IUPUI.   He became an associate professor in 2004, directing the department's  Motorsports Technology program.  In 2007, he earned his second graduate degree, a M.S. Applied & Industrial Mathematics from IUPUI.

Amateur Racing 

A competition driver for 25 years, Hylton has been active in the Sports Car Club of America since 1973. In January, 2007, he received the SCCA's highest honor, the Woolf Barnato Award, for his service to the organization.  Hylton, who served on the SCCA board of directors for nine years, remains the youngest-ever elected member of that body.

After retiring from his position on the board, he took on the responsibility of volunteer historian and archivist for the world's largest active motorsports membership organization. Since 1996, he has collected and organized publications, photos, racing statistics, and artifacts that have accumulated for sixty-two years. In the course of his task, Hylton became a contributing writer to SportsCar the magazine published by the SCCA.

Family life

Born in Indianapolis, he and his wife Wendy live in Brownsburg, Indiana with their three daughters.  In 2007, they converted the historic Grandison Eaton house, which was built in the 1860s and is one of Hendricks County's historic buildings, to a Bed and Breakfast.

Publications & Presentations 

  P. Hylton and W. Otoupal, Stratification of Attitudes and Skill Level As Correlated with knowledge and Self-confidence in a Pre-Engineering Curriculum, Proceedings of the 2007 Frontiers in Education Conference, Milwaukee, Wisconsin, October 2007.
 P. Hylton and W. Otoupal, Multiple Experiences in Moving from a Traditional Classroom Setting to an On-Line Teaching Environment, Proceedings of the 2007 Frontiers in Education Conference, Milwaukee, Wisconsin, October 2007.
 P. Hylton, Alternate Approaches for a Capstone Design Course Proceedings of the 2007 Frontiers in Education Conference, Milwaukee, Wisconsin, October 2007.
 P. Hylton, Motorsports Education Panel. South-tec conference, Charlotte, NC, October 4, 2007.
 P. Hylton, How to Turn an MG Into a Jaguar, British Motoring, Fall 2007.
 C. Feldhaus, K. Reid, K. Rieke, and P Hylton, Engineering Empowerment is Mathematicians Collaborating for Children E2=MC2, Proceedings of the 2007 American Society for Engineering Education National Conference, Honolulu, Hawaii, June 2007.
 P. Hylton and W. Otoupal, Moving from a Traditional Classroom Setting to an On-Line Teaching Environment, Proceedings of the 2007 ASEE IL/IN Section Conference, Indianapolis, Indiana, March 2007.
 P. Hylton,  Let's Go Racing – Constructing a Collegiate Motorsports Program, Proceedings of the 2007 ASEE IL/IN Section Conference, Indianapolis, Indiana, March 2007.
 P. Hylton, Motorsports Education, INGear Summit Conference, Indianapolis, Indiana, May 13, 2007.
 P. Hylton, Motorsports in Education – A Panel Discussion, SME Motorsports Indiana Industry Meeting, Indianapolis, Indiana, January 2007.
 P. Hylton, Teaching Math with Real World Correlation. ASEE Workshop on K-12 Engineering Education, 2006 American Society for Engineering Education National Convention,  Chicago, Illinois, June 2006.
 P. Hylton & W. Otoupal, Improving Skills and Attitudes in Minority Females Training for Engineering and Technology Careers, Proceedings of the 2006 WEPAN Conference, Pittsburgh, Pennsylvania, June 2006.

Notes 

Living people
1957 births